Newquay Treviglas is an electoral division of Cornwall in the United Kingdom and returns one member to sit on Cornwall Council. The current Councillor is Mark Formosa, a Conservative.

Extent
Newquay Treviglas covers the north east of the town of Newquay, as well as the villages of St Columb Minor and Porth. The division covers 171 hectares in total.

Election results

2018 by-election

2017 election

2016 by-election

2013 election

2009 election

References

Newquay
Electoral divisions of Cornwall Council